The Cowlitz language is a member of the Tsamosan branch of the Coast Salish family of Salishan languages.

Cowlitz people
The Cowlitz people were originally two distinct tribes: the Lower Cowlitz and the Upper Cowlitz. Only the Lower Cowlitz spoke Cowlitz; the Upper Cowlitz, a Sahaptin tribe, spoke a dialect of Yakama.

Phonology

Vocabulary

Cowlitz is most similar to Lower Chehalis, another Tsamosan language, although it contains some oddities, such as the word for one, utsus (in contrast to the Lower Chehalis paw).

References

Native-Languages.org.
Kinkade, Dale. Cowlitz Dictionary And Grammatical Sketch. Missoula: University of Montana Press, 2004.

See also 

 Cowlitz (tribe)
 Salishan languages
 Native American Languages

Languages of the United States
Coast Salish languages
Indigenous languages of the Pacific Northwest Coast
Extinct languages of North America
Indigenous languages of Washington (state)